Bobby Clark (born 27 January 1944) is a former Scotland rugby union international player.

Rugby Union career

Amateur career

He played for Melville College.

He played for Edinburgh Wanderers.

He also played rugby union for the Royal Navy.

Provincial career

He played for Edinburgh District and captained the side. He was part of that season's squad that won the Scottish Inter-District Championship in a play-off in the 1971-72 season, although he did not play in the play-off match.

International career

He was capped by Scotland 'B' to play France 'B' in 1971.

He went on to play for Scotland 9 times. He scored a try in the 5 February 1972 match against Wales; although Scotland slumped to a 35-12 defeat in the match.

Academic career

He worked for many years as a Staff Tutor in the Faculty of Technology within the Open University.

References

1944 births
Living people
Rugby union players from Edinburgh
Scottish rugby union players
Scotland international rugby union players
Scotland 'B' international rugby union players
Royal Navy rugby union players
Edinburgh Wanderers RFC players
Edinburgh District (rugby union) players
Melville College FP players
Rugby union hookers